The Cosumnes River AVA is an American Viticultural Area located in both Sacramento County and San Joaquin County, California. Located mostly in Sacramento County, the region is part of the larger Lodi AVA and includes a portion of the lower Cosumnes River. At these low elevations, frequent fog keeps the Cosumnes River AVA cooler than other regions of Lodi.

References

American Viticultural Areas of California
Cosumnes River
Geography of Sacramento County, California
Geography of San Joaquin County, California
2006 establishments in California
American Viticultural Areas